MPN may refer to:

 Manufacturer part number, an identifier
 Memory part number, an identifier for computer memory
 Master promissory note, a wide-encompassing accounting contract
 Metal-phenolic network, a supramolecular coordination structure consisting of metal ions and polyphenols 
 Microsoft Partner Network, a network of Microsoft partner companies and vendors
 MintPress News, an American left-wing news website
 Mobil Producing Nigeria, a Nigerian petroleum company
 Most probable number, a method for estimating counts from positive/negative data
 Movimiento Popular Neuquino, a provincial political party in the province of Neuquén, Argentina
 Mutual Progressive Network, a 1970s US radio network
 Myeloproliferative neoplasms, a family of blood cancers in which excess cells are produced
 RAF Mount Pleasant (IATA airport code), a British military base in the Falkland Islands